Guidimé is a rural commune in the Cercle of Yélimané in the Kayes Region of western Mali. The commune includes twelve villages. The administrative center (chef-lieu) is the town of Yélimané. In the 2009 census the commune had a population of 44,019.

References

Communes of Kayes Region